Metastases is a 2009 Croatian crime drama/comedy film about some of the most common problems in post-war Croatia, including football hooliganism, drug addiction and alcoholism. It was directed by Branko Schmidt.

Plot
Set in 1999, the film follows the lives of four unconventional friends from a Zagreb neighbourhood – Krpa, Filip, Kizo and Dejo. All of them are football fans and Dinamo Zagreb supporters.

Krpa is an antisocial football hooligan and Croatian War of Independence veteran who constantly abuses his wife. Throughout the film, he also insults and physically attacks several people who complain about his behaviour. In the final scene, he robs a betting shop and is involved in a foot chase with two police officers.

Filip is a drug addict who spent three years in a rehabilitation program in Spain. When he returns to Zagreb at the beginning of the film, his parents try to persuade him to find a job to prevent him from returning to his previous habits. The same day, he reunites with the remaining three members of the group at a neighbourhood bar.

Kizo is an ailurophiliac alcoholic and Croatian War of Independence veteran. He lives with his mother after the death of his father. One day, he goes to the bar to meet the rest of the group, so they can go to a football match together, only to learn that they had already left the bar without waiting for him to come. He goes back home, also visiting a supermarket to buy alcoholic beverages and cat food. He is then seen drinking and taking care of a litter of kittens in his backyard.

Dejo, a Serb, is the son of a former Yugoslav officer. He is also a drug addict and owes people money. His ethnicity constantly leads to insults from Krpa, who even persuades him to kiss the Altar of the Homeland.

Along with Filip, Dejo goes to Sarajevo to buy heroin. On their way back home, they visit Filip's aunt and uncle somewhere in Bosnia and Herzegovina. Filip's aunt and uncle say they would like to give his parents two bags of potatoes, but he says there is not enough space in Dejo's car to transport the bags, so they agree to transport them on their own in a few days. Filip hides the drug inside one of the bags, but it is eventually found by the border police when the bags are transported by a neighbour of Filip's aunt and uncle, Reuf, who did not know about the drugs.

Cast

 Rene Bitorajac as Krpa
 Franjo Dijak as Filip
 Robert Ugrina as Kizo
 Rakan Rushaidat as Dejo
 Ivo Gregurević as Filip's Father
 Ljiljana Bogojević as Filip's Mother
 Daria Lorenci as Milica
 Jadranka Đokić as Krpa's Wife
 Ksenija Marinković as Kizo's Mother
 Predrag Vušović as Dejo's Father
 Franjo Jurčec as Krpa's Neighbour
 Vera Zima as Aunt Zora
 Emir Hadžihafizbegović as Reuf
 Ivan Brkić as Uncle Brane
 Filip Šovagović as Zombi

Awards
The film won three Golden Arena awards at the 2009 Pula Film Festival:
 Big Golden Arena for Best Film
 Golden Arena for Best Actor (Rene Bitorajac as Krpa)
 Golden Arena for Best Makeup

See also
List of Croatian films

References

External links
 

2009 films
2009 crime drama films
Croatian crime drama films
2000s Croatian-language films
Films directed by Branko Schmidt
Films about drugs
Films about alcoholism
Films set in Zagreb
Films based on Croatian novels